Yevgeny Martynov or Yevhen Martynov (born 9 March 1976) is a former competitive figure skater who represented Ukraine. He won gold at the 1998 Golden Spin of Zagreb, silver at the 1998 Nebelhorn Trophy, and two medals at the Prague Skate. He placed fifth at the 1995 World Junior Championships.

After retiring from competition, Martynov moved to the United States. He coaches in Naperville, Illinois. His past and present students include Bradie Tennell and Nicholas Vrdoljak.

Competitive highlights

References 

Ukrainian male single skaters
Ukrainian emigrants to the United States
Living people
Sportspeople from Kharkiv
1976 births
Competitors at the 1997 Winter Universiade
Competitors at the 1999 Winter Universiade